George Henry Warwick Smith  (3 October 1916 – 27 December 1999) was a senior Australian public servant.

Early life
Warwick Smith was born in Charters Towers, Queensland on 3 November 1916. He attended high school at Brisbane Grammar School, but left early at the age of 15. He went on to matriculate and graduate with a Bachelor of Arts from the University of Queensland.

Career
Warwick Smith moved from a job at the Queensland Education Department to the Commonwealth Public Service in the Department of Commerce. He soon left the public service to join the Army, serving during the Second World War between 1941 and 1945.

After the war, Warwick Smith returned to his public service career in the Department of Commerce. He was appointed personal assistant to the Department's Secretary, J.F. Murphy, with whom he gained a lot of trade conference experience.

Warwick Smith's first Secretary role was in the Department of Territories (later External Territories), he moved to the Department in 1964, a time when Australia was coming under increasing United Nations pressure to hasten Papua New Guinea's progress towards self-government. Warwick Smith established an unusual departmental structure with no deputy secretaries, which was unlike most Australian Government departments at the time.

He also served as Secretary in the Department of the Interior and the Secretary of the Department of Construction (later Housing and Construction).

Warwick Smith formally retired from the public service on 5 August 1980, his last position being as Secretary of the Department of Housing and Construction.

Retirement
On retirement from the public service, Warwick Smith moved away from Canberra, first to Sydney and later to Bowral, working as a consultant in economic and public affairs. In his later years, Warwick Smith suffered from emphysema, which led to his death on 27 December 1999 in a nursing home in Sydney.

Notes

References and further reading

1916 births
1999 deaths
Australian Commanders of the Order of the British Empire
Australian public servants
University of Queensland alumni